The  was a flight demonstration team created in 1977 integrated with Esquadra 103 (103 Squadron) of the Portuguese Air Force. It was Portugal's national aerobatic flying team and flew two ex-German Air Force Dassault-Breguet/Dornier Alpha Jets.

History
In 1977, Asas de Portugal was created by order of the Air Force Chief of Staff (CEMFA), with the objective to represent the Portuguese Air Force (PoAF) at the International Air Tattoo air festival. This was the third aerobatics team established by the PoAF, after two teams of the 1950s — the Dragões (Dragons) and the São Jorge (Saint George) teams.

Asas de Portugal operated the Cessna T-37C for 13 years while integrated with the 102 Squadron Panchos.

The single fatal accident in the team's history occurred on 9 December 1990, when one of its T-37Cs suffered a catastrophic wing structural failure during a practice session, killing team pilot José Magalhães da Costa. The accident prompted a fleet-wide inspection which revealed that all but five T-37 aircraft in the PoAF inventory suffered from fatigue induced micro-cracks in the wings' structure. Repairs to airworthy status were considered financially inadvisable. This conclusion, together with a restructure of the PoAF in the 1990s, led to the phase-out of the T-37 and an interruption of the team's activities.

In 1997 the team was reactivated, being integrated with the 103 Squadron Caracóis and equipped with Dassault-Breguet/Dornier Alpha Jet aircraft, having a team of seven officer pilots and a maintenance team. The first public appearance with the Alpha Jet was on June 27, 1997, at the commemorations of the PoAF's 45th anniversary in Sintra.

In 1998, the team was deactivated for logistics reasons.

On the occasion of the PoAF's 50th anniversary in 2001, the responsibility to prepare an Alpha Jet flight demonstration for the commemorations was given to 103 Squadron. This resulted in the creation of a two-aircraft display team that represented Portugal with a 16-minute sequence of maneuvers in those commemorations, leading to the idea and plan of expanding the display.

In 2005, the Asas de Portugal were definitively reactivated, being once again integrated with 103 Squadron, based at Beja Air Base. The team was deactivated again in 2010, before the start of the airshow season.

See also
Rotores de Portugal

External links

Asas de Portugal official website 
Recodando os Asas de Portugal - I Parte (Remembering the Asas de Portugal - Part I), Mais Alto September/October 2002 issue 
Recordando os Asas de Portugal - II Parte (Remembering the Asas de Portugal - Part II), Mais Alto November/December 2002 issue 
Asas de Portugal - The return of the Alpha Jet Acrobatic Patrol, Nuno Martins, January 22, 2003 
Asas de Portugal - 30 Anos, photographic gallery of the Asas de Portugal 30th anniversary

Portuguese Air Force
Aerobatic teams
Military units and formations established in 1977
Military units and formations disestablished in 1990
Military units and formations established in 1997
Military units and formations disestablished in 1998
Military units and formations established in 2005
Military units and formations disestablished in 2010